The Massacre of Naoussa or Destruction of Naoussa was a bloody event of the Greek War of Independence that occurred on 13 April 1822.

Events before the siege
Plans for the upcoming revolution had already begun in the region long before its outbreak, so the Ottomans decided to take measures to prevent it. In January 1821 the wali of Thessaloniki Ebu Lubut imprisoned members of some of the most important families of West Macedonia. Some, however, like the "warband" leaders Anastasios Karatasos and Angelis Gatsos and also the notable Zafeirakis Theodosiou refused to surrender themselves to Ottoman authorities. After the arrests they gathered in a church and declared revolution against the Ottoman rule. This group ultimately marshaled 1,800 people to strike back as a rebellion, Veroia, but the attack failed when Ottoman reinforcements arrived.

The siege
Ebu Lubut then led the attack against Naoussa, at the head of 20,000 men. The city was defended by 4,000-5,000 Greek rebels. On 26 March Ebu Lubut requested that the rebels give up and let his forces occupy the city. The Ottomans began an organised siege at the beginning of April with multiple forces attacking the city. On April 12 the Ottomans bombarded the city and destroyed the gates, capturing the city. It followed a general massacre of the population, up to 5,000 according to Spyridon Trikoupis.

1822 in Greece
Massacres during the Greek War of Independence
Greek War of Independence
Massacres in Greece
Massacres committed by the Ottoman Empire
Ottoman war crimes
Imathia
Massacres in the Ottoman Empire
Conflicts in 1822
Persecution of Greeks in the Ottoman Empire before the 20th century
April 1822 events